Custom Air Transport was a cargo airline based in Fort Lauderdale, Florida, USA which began service on December 9, 1995.

History 
The airline was established in March 1995 and began operations in December 1995. It is wholly owned by Anthony Romeo, who is also the Chairman and Chief Executive. CAT operated cargo flights on behalf of Emery Worldwide to and from its hub in Dayton, Ohio until Emery's parent company CF Transportation split the air freight activities into its own division, Menlo Forwarding, which took over the contract with CAT. In 2005, UPS acquired Menlo Forwarding and shut down the Dayton hub. CAT's last flight for Menlo Forwarding was on June 30, 2006, when the Dayton hub was officially closed and all but a few CAT pilots and flight engineers were furloughed. Except for a few aircraft in South Florida, CAT's fleet of Boeing 727 aircraft was parked shortly thereafter.   CAT performed some flights in the Caribbean, Central America, and South America. On April 26, 2012 CAT delivered its remaining Boeing 727 to Aeronaves Peruanas Air cargo and ceased all activity.

Destinations 

Custom Air Transport operated the following services (at January 2005):

Domestic scheduled destinations: Chicago and Dayton.
International scheduled destinations: Mexico City.

Fleet 

The Custom Air Transport fleet consisted of the following aircraft (as of March 2007):

See also 
 List of defunct airlines of the United States

References

External links

Custom Air Transport

Defunct airlines of the United States
Airlines established in 1995
Companies based in Fort Lauderdale, Florida
Airlines based in Florida
1995 establishments in Florida
2012 disestablishments in Florida
Airlines disestablished in 2012